The following is a partial list of country estates in Northern Ireland:

County Antrim
 Glenarm Castle Estate
 Shane's Castle Estate
 Lissanoure Castle Estate

County Armagh
 Gosford Castle
 Drumbanagher House

County Down
 Narrow Water Castle
 Clandeboye Estate
 Dundrum Castle
 Greencastle
 Jordan's Castle
 Kilclief Castle
 Killyleagh Castle
 Kirkistown Castle
 Hillsborough Castle
 Margaret's Castle
 Mount Stewart
 Quintin Castle
 Quoile Castle
 Sketrick Castle
 Strangford Castle
 Walshestown Castle
 Portavo House
Seaforde

County Fermanagh
 Castle Coole
 Castle Balfour
 Crom Castle
 Knockninny Castle
 Monea Castle
 Necarne Castle
 Belle Isle Castle
 Tully Castle

County Londonderry
 Drenagh Estate
 Dawson Castle
 Lakeside Estate
 Boom Hall

County Tyrone
 Baronscourt Estate
 Benburb Castle
 Castle Caulfield
 Harry Avery's Castle
 Killymoon Castle
 Mountjoy Castle
 Roughan Castle
 Stewart Castle

See also
 List of castles in Northern Ireland
 List of castles in the Republic of Ireland
 List of castles
 Abbeys and priories in Northern Ireland
 Abbeys and priories in the Republic of Ireland

Castles in Northern Ireland
Castles in Northern Ireland
Northern Ireland
Lists of buildings and structures in Northern Ireland

ru:Список замков Северной Ирландии